Herbert George Edward Ledgard Burton (1864 – 28 May 1910) was a New Zealand cricketer. He played in seven first-class matches for Wellington from 1893 to 1898. His son Herbert and grandson John also played first-class cricket for Wellington.

See also
 List of Wellington representative cricketers

References

External links
 

1864 births
1910 deaths
New Zealand cricketers
Wellington cricketers
Cricketers from Yorkshire